The Romani in Spain, generally known by the exonym  or the endonym Calé, belong to the Iberian Cale Romani subgroup, with smaller populations in Portugal (known as ) and in Southern France.

Traditionally, they maintain their social circles strictly within their patrigroups, as interaction between patrigroups increases the risk of feuding, which may result in fatalities. The emergence of Pentecostalism has impacted this practice, as the lifestyle of Pentecostal gitanos involves frequent contact with gitanos from outside their own patrigroups during church services and meetings. Data on ethnicity are not collected in Spain, although the public pollster CIS estimated in 2007 that the number of gitanos present in Spain is probably around one million.

Name
The term gitano evolved from the word egiptano ("Egyptian"), which was the Old Spanish demonym for someone from Egipto (Egypt). "Egiptano" was the regular adjective in Old Spanish for someone from Egypt, however, in Middle and Modern Spanish the irregular adjective egipcio supplanted egiptano to mean Egyptian, probably to differentiate Egyptians proper from Gypsys. Meanwhile, the term egiptano evolved through elision into egitano and finally into gitano, losing the meaning of Egyptian and carrying with it a specific meaning of Romanis in Spain. The two peoples are now unambiguously differentiated in modern Spanish, "egipcios" for Egyptians and "gitanos" for Roma in Spain, with "egiptano" being obsolete for either.

Though etymologically the term gitano originally meant "Egyptian", the use itself of the Old Spanish word meaning "Egyptian" (egiptano) to refer to Romanis in Spain developed in the same way that the English word "Gypsy" also evolved from the English adjective "Egyptian" to refer to Romanis in Britain. Some Romanis, a people originating in the northern regions of the Indian subcontinent, upon their first arrivals to Europe, either claimed to be Egyptians for a more favourable treatment by local Europeans, or were mistaken as Egyptians by local Europeans.

Origin
 
The Romani people originate from northwestern Hindustan, presumably from the northwestern Indian state of Rajasthan and the Punjab region shared between India and Pakistan.

The linguistic evidence has indisputably shown that roots of Romani language lie in the Indian subcontinent: the language has grammatical characteristics of Indic languages and shares with them a big part of the basic lexicon, for example, body parts, daily routines and numerals.

More exactly, Romani shares the basic lexicon with Hindi and Punjabi. It shares many phonetic features with Marwari, while its grammar is closest to Bengali. Linguistic evaluation carried out in the nineteenth century by Pott (1845) and Miklosich (1882–1888) showed that the Romani language is to be classed as a New Indo-Aryan language (NIA), not a Middle Indo-Aryan (MIA), establishing that the ancestors of the Romani could not have left the Indian subcontinent significantly earlier than AD 1000, then finally reaching Europe several hundred years later.

Genetic findings in 2012 suggest the Romani originated in the northwestern region of the Indian subcontinent and migrated as a group.
According to a genetic study in 2012, the ancestors of present scheduled tribes and scheduled caste populations of northern India, traditionally referred to collectively as the "Ḍoma", are the likely ancestral populations of modern "Roma" in Europe.

Migration to Spain
How and when the Romani arrived in the Iberian Peninsula from Northern India is a question whose consensus is far from being reached. A popular theory, although without any documentation, claims they came from North Africa, from where they would have crossed the Strait of Gibraltar to meet again in France with the northern migratory route. Thus, gitanos would be a deformation of Latin Tingitani, that is, from Tingis, today Tangier. Another, more consistent theory, and well documented, is that they entered the Iberian Peninsula from France. Although there is controversy of the date of the first arrival, since there is evidence of a safe conduct granted in Perpignan in 1415 by the infante Alfonso of Aragon to one Tomás, son of Bartolomé de Sanno, who is said to be "Indie Majoris". Or instead, could be the so-called Juan de Egipto Menor, who entered through France, who in 1425 Alfonso V granted him a letter of insurance, which is mostly accepted as the first Romani person to reach the peninsula.

In 1435 they were seen in Santiago de Compostela. Gitanos were recorded in Barcelona and Zaragoza by 1447, and in 1462 they were received with honors in Jaén. Years later, to the gitanos, the grecianos, pilgrims who penetrated the Mediterranean shore in the 1480s, were added to them, probably because of the fall of Constantinople. Both of them continued to wander throughout the peninsula, being well received at least until 1493, year in which a group of gitanos arrived at Madrid, where the Council agreed to "... give alms to the gitanos because at the request of the City passed ahead, ten reales, to avoid the damages that could be done by three hundred people who came ... ".

In those years safe conducts were granted to supposedly noble Calé pilgrims. The follow-up of these safe-conducts throughout Spain has provided some data to historians according to Teresa San Román:

 The number of Romani that entered or inhabited the Peninsula in the 15th-century is estimated at approximately 3,000 individuals.
 The Roma traveled in variable groups, of 80-150 people, led by a man.
 Each autonomous group maintained relations at a distance with one of the others, there being perhaps relations of kinship among them (something common today among Spanish Romani).
 The separation between each group was variable and sometimes some followed the others at close range and by the same routes.
 The most common survival strategy was to present as Christian pilgrims to seek the protection of a noble.
 The way of life was nomadic and dedicated to divination and performance (spectacle).

In 1492, the Roma auxiliaries helped the army of the Kingdom of Castile and León in the Reconquista in Granada ending the reign of Muslims in Spain.

Gitanos have a low and little politically committed role, with some particular exceptions, in Andalusian nationalism and identity, which is strongly based on a belief in the oriental basis of Andalusi heritage acted as a bridge between occidental-western and oriental-eastern Andalusian culture at a popular level. The father of such a movement, Blas Infante, in his book Orígenes de lo flamenco y secreto del cante jondo, etymologically, went as far as alleging that the word flamenco derives from Andalusian Arabic fellah mengu, supposedly meaning "escapee peasant". Infante believed that numerous Muslim Andalusians became Moriscos, who were obliged to convert, dispersed and eventually ordered to leave Spain stayed and mixed with the Romani newcomers instead of abandoning their land. These claims have been rejected by genetic research papers.

For about 300 years, Romanies were subject to a number of laws and policies designed to eliminate them from Spain as an identifiable group: Romani settlements were broken up and the residents dispersed; sometimes, Romanies were required to marry non-Roma; they were prohibited from using their language and rituals, and were excluded from public office and from guild membership. In 1749, a major effort to get rid of the Calé population in Spain was carried out through a raid organized by the government.

During the Spanish Civil War, gitanos were not persecuted for their ethnicity by either side. Under the regime of Francisco Franco, gitanos were often harassed or simply ignored, although their children were educated, sometimes forcibly, much as all Spaniards are nowadays.

In the post-Franco era, Spanish government policy has been much more sympathetic, especially in the area of social welfare and social services. In 1977, the last anti-Romani laws were repealed, an action promoted by Juan de Dios Ramírez Heredia, the first Romani deputy.

Beginning in 1983, the government operated a special program of Compensatory Education to promote educational rights for the disadvantaged, including those in Romani communities. During the heroin epidemic that afflicted Spain in the 1980s and 1990s, gitano shanty towns became central to the drug trade, a problem which afflicts Spain to this day. Nevertheless, Spain is still considered a model for integration of gitano communities when compared to other countries with Romani populations in Eastern Europe.

Language

Historically, gitanos spoke Caló fluently, often alongside the language spoken in the region they inhabited. Caló is a type of para-Romani, combining the phonology and grammar of the Catalan or Castilian, with a lexicon derived from Romani. The para-Romani resulting from the combination of Basque and Romani is called Erromintxela. Very few gitanos maintain a comprehensive and functional knowledge of Caló. A study on the actual usage patterns of Caló among a group of mainly Andalusian gitanos concluded that the language currently consists of between 350 and 400 unique terms, the knowledge of which varies considerably among gitanos. This would exclude a similar number of Calo words which have entered mainstream Spanish slang. According to the authors of the study, the majority of gitanos acknowledge that the language is in a terminal state, with many asserting that the language is totally lost.

Marriage
A traditional gitano wedding requires a pedimiento (similar to an engagement party) followed by the casamiento (wedding ceremony), where el yeli must be sung to the bride to celebrate the virginity and honour of the bride (proven by the ritual of the pañuelo). In the pañuelo ritual, a group consisting of an ajuntaora (a professional who is skilled in performing the ritual and is paid by the family), along with the married women of the family, take the bride into a separate room during the wedding and examine her to ascertain that she is a virgin. The ajuntaora is the one who performs the ritual on the bride, as the other women watch to be witnesses that the bride is virgin. The ajuntaora wraps a white, decoratively embroidered cloth (the pañuelo) around her index finger and inserts it shallowly into the vaginal canal of the bride. During this process, the Bartholin's glands are depressed, causing them to secrete a liquid that stains the cloth. This action is repeated with three different sections of the cloth to produce three stains, known as "rosas". This process is conceived by the women as the retrieval of the bride's "honra", her honour, contained within a "grape" inside her genitals which is popped during the examination, and the spillage collected onto the pañuelo.

When finished with the exam, the women come out of the room and sing el yeli to the couple. During this, the men at the wedding rip their shirts and lift the wife onto their shoulders and do the same with the husband, as they sing "el yeli" to them. Weddings can last very long; up to three days is usual in Gitano culture. At weddings, gitanos invite everyone and anyone that they know of (especially other gitanos). On some occasions, payos (gadjos) may attend as well, although this is not common. Through the night, many bulerías are danced and especially sung. Today, rumba gitana or rumba flamenca are a usual party music fixture.

Gitanos may also marry by elopement, an event that garners less approval than a wedding ceremony.

Crime issues
According to a website of the Fundación Secretariado Gitano ("Gitano Secretariat Foundation"), published in 2002, in the Spanish prison system the Spanish Romani women represented 25% of the incarcerated female population, while Spanish Romani people represented 1.4% of the total Spanish population. In Portugal, 64% of the detentions of gitano people were drug trafficking-related, 93.2% of women inmates for drug trafficking were gitanas, and 13.2% of the total drug trafficking-related inmates were of gitano ethnicity.

Marginalisation
Marginalisation occurs on an institutional level. Gitano children are regularly segregated from their non-gitano peers and have poorer academic outcomes. In 1978, 68% of adult gitanos were illiterate. Literacy has greatly improved over time, and approximately 10% of gitanos were illiterate as of 2006-2007 (with older gitanos much more likely than younger gitanos to be illiterate). Ninety-eight percent of gitanos live below the poverty line. Health outcomes and housing - including reduced access to clean water and electricity supplies - is poorer amongst Roma compared to non-Roma in Spain and Portugal, in common with the other surveyed European countries.

Roma continue to experience discrimination on an interpersonal level, such as by being refused entry to bars and clubs or losing their jobs if their ethnicity is made known to their employer. In 2016, the European Union Agency for Fundamental Rights reported that its survey showed 71 percent of Portuguese cigano, and 51 percent of Spanish gitano had suffered an episode of discrimination within the previous five years. A traditional discriminatory practice in Portugal, where shops and businesses display toad figurines at entrances to dissuade ciganos from entering, was reported as being still widely seen in Portugal in 2019. (Toads are viewed as symbolic of evil and ill-omen in Roma communities in Portugal.) Ciganos and anti-discrimination activists complained of hostility to Roma being commonplace and unremarkable. Some shopkeepers were noted as defending their discouragement of Roma as appropriate.

The 2016 Pew Research poll found that 49% of Spaniards held unfavorable views of Roma.

In literature
The gitano in Spanish society have inspired several authors:
Federico García Lorca, a great Spanish poet of the 20th century, wrote Romancero Gitano ("Gypsy Ballad Book")

Candela, the female protagonist of the story El Amor Brujo, by Manuel de Falla is Romani.
Prosper Mérimée's Carmen (1845) features the protagonist as a femme fatale, ready to lie, or attack and degrade men's lives. His work was adapted for Georges Bizet's opera of the same name.
The beauty of a dark-haired Gitana has inspired artists such as Julio Romero de Torres.
La Gitanilla ("The little Gypsy girl"), short story by Miguel de Cervantes and part of his Exemplary Novels
Rocio Eva Granada, the escort in the novel Digital Fortress by Dan Brown

Notable gitanos

Following are notable Spanish people of Calé (gitano) ethnicity:

Leaders and politicians 
Juan de Dios Ramírez Heredia, Spanish Socialist Workers' Party MEP
Sara Giménez, Spanish Gypsy Politic in Spanish Politic Party Ciudadanos
Séfora Vargas Spanish Gypsy Political Activist and Lawyer

Historians, philologists and writers 
Joaquín Albaicín, writer, lecturer and columnist for the artistic life
Matéo Maximoff, French writer born in Barcelona
Paca Torres[Paca Torres] Spanish Gypsy Woman Writer, Poet and Rhapsode
Iker Jiménez[] journalist, writer, historian, television presenter and YouTuber

Poets, novelists and playwrights 
José Heredia Maya, poet and dramaturge
Luis Heredia Amaya, sculptor
Antonio Maya Cortés, artist painter and sculptor
Fabian de Castro, artist painter

Catholic saints and martyrs 
Ceferino Giménez Malla, blessed

Painters and sculptors 
Helios Gómez, artist, writer and poet
Juan Vargas, sculptor

Actors, comedians and entertainers 
Rogelio Durán, theatre actor  and father of Swedish actress Noomi Rapace
Pastora Vega, actress
Alba Flores, actress; granddaughter of Antonio González (El Pescaílla) and daughter of singer Antonio Flores
Jesús Castro (actor), actor of film The Niño. 
El Comandante Lara, comedian and singer
Juan Rosa Mateo, comedian of Duo Sacapuntas
Elena Furiase Spanish Actress of Gypsy Origin
Familia Gallo[Familia Gallo] Spanish Gypsy family of flamenco musicians and bullfighters

Footballers and football coaches 
José Antonio Reyes, ex-footballer, for Arsenal F.C., Sevilla FC...
José Rodríguez Martínez, footballer, currently plays for Maccabi Haifa F.C.
Jesús Seba, footballer, ex-Real Zaragoza
Diego, former footballer, with Sevilla Fútbol Club (Sevilla FC)
Carlos Muñoz, former footballer, with Real Oviedo
Carlos Aranda, former footballer, with Sevilla FC
Ivan Amaya, former footballer, with Atletico Madrid
Antonio Amaya, footballer, for Rayo Vallecano
Marcos Márquez, footballer, ex-UD Las Palmas
López Ramos, footballer, ex-UD Las Palmas
Antonio Cortés Heredia  footballer for Málaga
Ezequiel Calvente ex-footballer Real Betis
Téji Savanier footballer frech of the origin calo Spanish, footballer Montpellier
Jesús Navas, footballer, with Sevilla FC

Other athletes 
Rafael Soto, equestrian and Olympic medalist
Faustino Reyes, boxer
José Antonio Jiménez, boxer
Patxi Ruiz Giménez, Basque pelota champion

Singers and musicians 
Carmen Amaya, Flamenco dancer
Isabel Pantoja, singer, partially Calé
Los Chunguitos, singers, brother duo
Azúcar Moreno, singers, sister duo
Manolo Caracol, Flamenco singer
El Pescaílla, singer and composer, husband of Lola Flores
Lolita Flores, singer and actress, daughter of Lola Flores and El Pescaílla
Antonio Flores, singer and actor, son of Lola Flores and El Pescaílla
Rosario Flores, singer and actress, daughter of Lola Flores and El Pescaílla
Vicente Escudero, dancer and choreographer of Spanish Flamenco; occasionally painter, writer, cinematographic actor and flamenco singer
Gipsy Kings, French group of Flamenco Rumba
Nicolas Reyes, lead vocalist of the Gipsy Kings
Camarón de la Isla, Flamenco singer
Farruquito, Flamenco dancer
Los Niños de Sara, French fusion musicians
Ketama, fusion musicians
Kendji Girac, French singer
Diego "El Cigala", Flamenco singer
Joaquín Cortés, star flamenco dancer
Beatriz Luengo, singer and actress
Natalia Jiménez, singer and vocalist of La quinta estacion
Jorge González, singer
 Manitas de Plata, guitar musician
 Peret, Catalan singer, guitar player and composer of Catalan rumba
Camela, singers of Spanish musical group of techno rumba and flamenco pop.
Los Chichos singers
Las Grecas singers
Estrella Morente singer
Niña Pastori singer and composer
Belén Maya bailaora Flamenca dancer
Juan Villar, Cantaor Flamenco Singer
José Mercé, Cantaor Flamenco Singer
El Príncipe Gitano, Cantaor Flamenco Singer And Bailaor Flamenco Dancer
Dolores Vargas, "La Terremoto" Cantaora Flamenco Singer And Bailaora Flamenco Dancer
Gerardo Núñez, Spanish Gypsy guitarist and composer
Mario Maya, Cantaor Flamenco Singer And Bailaor Flamenco Dancer
Tomatito, Spanish Flamenco Guitarist and Composer
Remedios Amaya, Spanish Gypsy Singer Cantaora Flamenco
Alba Flores, Spanish actress of gypsy origin
Miguel Vargas Jiménez [Miguel Vargas Jiménez] "Bambino" Cantaor Flamenco Singer
Falete[Falete] Cantaor Flamenco Singer
Marina Heredia [Marina Heredia] Cantaora Flamenco Singer
La ChungaLa Chunga Bailaora Flamenco Dancer
Manuel AgujetasManuel Agujetas Cantaor Flamenco Singer
Antonio MairenaAntonio Mairena Cantaor Flamenco Singer
Manuel TorreManuel Torre Cantaor Flamenco Singer
La Niña de los PeinesLa Niña de los Peines Cantaora Flamenco Singer
Arturo Pavón Cruz[Arturo Pavón Cruz] Cantaor Flamenco Singer
Gabriela Ortega Feria[Gabriela Ortega Feria] Cantaora Flamenco Singer
Pastora ImperioPastora Imperio Bailaora Flamenco Dancer
Chiquetete[Chiquetete] Cantaor Flamenco Singer and artist
El LebrijanoEl Lebrijano Flamenco Guitarist Musician
Paco CeperoPaco Cepero Flamenco Guitarist Musician
Vicente Soto SorderaVicente Soto Sordera Cantaor Flamenco Singer
Luisa Ortega Gomez[Luisa Ortega (cantante)] Cantaora Flamenco Singer Daughter Of Manolo Caracol
Pepa de Utrera[Pepa de Utrera] Cantaora Flamenco Singer 
Bernarda de Utrera[Bernarda de Utrera] Cantaora Flamenco Singer
Pinini[Pinini] Cantaor Flamenco Singer
Cancanilla de MarbellaCancanilla de Marbella Cantaor and Bailaor Flamenco Singer and Dancer
Perla de CádizPerla de Cádiz Cantaora Flamenco Singer
Los Chorbos[Los Chorbos] Flamenco Singer
Manzanita[Manzanita] Singer and Guitarrist Musician
Juan Antonio Jiménez Muñoz[Juan Antonio Jiménez Muñoz] Singer, Musician and Composer, member of Los Chichos
Los Calis[Los Calis] Singer Flamenco Rumba
Antonio El Chaqueta[Antonio "El Chaqueta"] Cantaor Flamenco Singer
José Manuel Ruíz Rosa[El Chino] Cantaor and Guitarrist Flamenco
La Repompa de Málaga[La Repompa de Málaga] Cantaora Flamenco Singer
José Losada "Carrete"[José Losada 'Carrete'] Bailaor Flamenco Dancer
Manuela Carrasco[Manuela Carrasco] Bailaora Flamenco Dancer
La Paquera de Jerez[La Paquera de Jerez] Cantaora Flamenco Singer
Tijeritas[Tijeritas] Singer Flamenco
Pitingo[Pitingo] Singer Flamenco and Pop
Moraito Chico[Moraíto Chico] Musician Guitarrist Flamenco
Diego Carrasco[Diego Carrasco]Cantaor Flamenco Guitarrist Musician
Manuel Morao[Manuel Morao] Guitarrist Flamenco Musician
Ramón Calabuch Batista[Moncho] Singer"Moncho"
Mala Rodríguez[Mala Rodríguez] Singer
Maria Fernández Granados[María Fernández Granados]Cantaora Flamenco Singer
Gaspar de Utrera[Gaspar de Utrera] Cantaor Flamenco Singer
Montse Cortés[Montse Cortés] Cantaora Flamenco Singer
La Serneta[La Serneta] Cantaora Flamenco Singer
Antonia La NegraAntonia La Negra Cantaora Flamenco Singer
Lole y ManuelLole y Manuel Flamenco Singers 
Alba MolinaAlba Molina Singer
Luisa Ramos Antunez[Luisa Ramos Antúnez]Cantaora Flamenco Singer
Niño Gloria[Niño Gloria] Cantaor Flamenco Singer
Fernanda de Utrera[Fernanda de Utrera]Cantaora Flamenco Singer
Rancapino[Rancapino]Cantaor Flamenco Singer
Ramón Montoya Salazar[Ramón Montoya Salazar] Flamenco Musician
Sabicas[Sabicas] Flamenco Musician
Esperanza Fernández Vargas[Esperanza Fernández Vargas]Cantaora Flamenco Singer
Farruco[Farruco]Bailaor Flamenco Dancer
Pilar Montoya[Pilar Montoya] Bailaora Flamenco Dancer
Juana la MacarronaJuana la Macarrona Cantaora Flamenco Singer
La Susi[La Susi] Cantaora Flamenco Singer
Vicente de Castro Giménez[Vicente de Castro "Parrita"] Cantaor Flamenco Singer and Flamenco Musician "El Parrita"
Antonio Carmona[Antonio Carmona] Singer Flamenco
Manuel Moreno Maya "El Pelé"[El Pele] Cantaor Flamenco Singer
La Macanita[La Macanita] Cantaora Flamenco Singer
Pansequito[Pansequito] Cantaor Flamenco Singer
Aurora Vargas[Aurora Vargas] Cantaora Flamenco Singer and Bailaora Flamenco Dancer
"La Marelu" Magdalena Montañez Salazar[] Cantaora Flamenco Singer
La Tobala[] Cantaora Flamenco Singer
"La Chiqui de Jerez" Milagros de los Reyes Bermúdez[]Cantaora Flamenco Singer
Juana la del Revuelo[] Cantaora Flamenco Singer
Montse Cortés [] Cantaora Flamenco Singer
Sylvia Pantoja[] Singer and Actress
Agustin Pantoja[] Singer
Kiko Rivera[] Singer, DJ Musician and Famous Spanish Character of Gypsy Origin by Mother
Moncho Chavea[] Singer
Original Elías[] Singer
Nyno Vargas[] Singer
Juan Habichuela[] Musician Flamenco Father of Antonio Carmona Singer of Ketama
Rafael Farina[] Folk and Flamenco Singer
Tamara[] Singer and granddaughter of Rafael Farina
Duquende[] Cantaor Flamenco Singer
Mayel Jiménez "Ismael Jiménez" [] Singer, Musician and Composer
Ricardo Gabarre "El Junco"[] Flamenco Singer
El Luis[] Flamenco Singer and Guitarrist
El Zingaro[] Flamenco Singer and Guitarrist
Los Chavis[] Flamenco Pop Singers
Los Yakis[] Flamenco Singers
Los Banis[] Flamenco Singers
Dionisio Martín Lobato "Dioni Martín"[] Singer Of Flamenco Pop and Techno Rumba Flamenca in Camela
Rubén Martín[] Singer Flamenco Pop, Composer and Son Of Dioni Martín[] Singer in Camela
Angelita Vargas[] Cantaora Flamenco Singer and Bailaora Flamenco Dancer
Juan Gómez "Chicuelo"[] Flamenco Musician Guitarrist
Ray Heredia[] Flamenco Musician and Composer
Manolete[] Bailaor Flamenco Dancer and Choreographer
Eva Yerbabuena[] Bailaora flamenco Dancer

Gitano surnames
Due to endogamy, several Spanish surnames are more frequent among the Gitanos, though they are not exclusive to them:
Altamira or Altamirano
Amaya
Antunes or Antúnez (alternatively, Antuñez)
Calaf (Catalan Gypsy)
Cortés
Fernández
Flores
Gabarri (Catalan Gypsy)
Gutiérrez or Guiterez
Heredia
Jiménez or Giménez
Malla or Maya
Molina
Montoya
Monge or Monje
Moreno
Morgade
Motos
 Pereiro or Pereira
Pubill (Catalan Gypsy)
Ravelino or Rabellino
Reyes
Salazar
Santi
Santiago
Vargas LP
Villar or Vilar
Carretero
Pérez
González
Escudero

See also 

 Triana, Seville, a neighbourhood traditionally linked to Gitano history.
 Sacromonte, the traditional Gitano quarter of Granada.
 George Borrow, an English missionary and traveller who studied the Calé of Spain and other parts of Europe.
 Quinqui, a nomad community of Spain with a similar lifestyle, but of unrelated origin.
 Cagot, similarly historically persecuted people in France and Spain.
 , an ethnic group in the Spanish Basque country and the French Basque coast sometimes linked to the Cagots.
 Cleanliness of blood, ethnic discrimination in the Spanish Old Regime.
 , an ethnic group in Spain who were also discriminated against and have unknown origins.
 , a discriminated group of cowherders in Northern Spain.
  a persecuted ethnic minority in Mallorca, often referenced in works discussing the persecution of Cagots in Spain.

References

Sources
Worth, Susannah and Sibley, Lucy R. "Maja Dress and the Andalusian Image of Spain." Clothing and Textiles Research Journal, Summer 1994, Vol. 12, pp. 51–60.

Notes

External links

Romani union (English exonym present)
Romani presence in European Music 

Spain
Ethnic groups in Spain
 
Romani in Spain